Lalduhoma (alternatively spelled Lalduhawma, born 22 February 1949) is an Indian politician and a former Indian Police Service officer from Mizoram. Resigning from the security service to the Prime Minister Indira Gandhi, he was elected as Member of Parliament to the Lok Sabha from Mizoram in 1984. He left the Indian National Congress, the party from which he was elected, for which he was disqualified from the parliament. He became the first MP to be discharged upon anti-defection law in India.

Lalduhoma is the founder and president of Zoram Nationalist Party, a regional political party in Mizoram. His party joined the coalition party Zoram People's Movement, in which he was chosen as the first Chief Ministerial candidate in the 2018 Mizoram Legislative Assembly election. He was elected from Aizawl West I and Serchhip constituencies, and chose to represent Serchhip. While serving as leader of the opposition of the legislature, he was disqualified as Member of the Legislative Assembly on charge of breaching anti-defection law in 2020 to become the first case in state legislatures in India. He was re-elected from the same Serchhip constituency in a by-election in 2021.

Early life
Lalduhoma is the son of a farmer, Vaisanga (L) and his wife Kaichhingi at Tualpui village. He is the youngest of four siblings. He studied at Khawzawl elementary and middle schools, and completed matriculation from G.M. High School at Champhai. He was appointed in 1972 as Principal Assistant at the Chief Minister's Office by Ch. Chhunga, the first Chief Minister of Mizoram. While working, he enrolled for an evening course of bachelor's degree and graduated with distinction from Gauhati University.

Career

Government services 
From 1972 to 1977 Lalduhoma worked as Principal Assistant to the Chief Minister of Mizoram. Following his graduation, he appeared for Indian civil services examinations at Shillong. Qualifying the Indian Police Service in 1977, he served as a squad leader at Goa to crush delinquent hippies and smugglers. His achievements were recognised by the national media. He was transferred to serve as security in-charge of Prime Minister Indira Gandhi at New Delhi in 1982. He was given special promotion as Deputy Commissioner of Police. He was also secretary of the organising committee of the 1982 Asian Games, chaired by Rajiv Gandhi.

Indian National Congress 
Inspired by Gandhi to work in politics, particularly on the political and social turmoil environment in Mizoram due to Mizo National Front insurgency that started in 1966, Lalduhoma resigned from police service to join the Indian National Congress party in 1984. Indira Gandhi's ministry entrusted him to resolve the insurgency by negotiating the MNF leader Laldenga. He visited Laldenga in London and persuaded him for peace talk with the Government of India. He also made Laldenga to make a message to the Mizo people that INC was the instrumental party of peace. As the elected Chief Minister Lal Thanhawla later reported, the recorded message made by Lalduhoma was the key in the success of INC in the 1984 Mizoram Legislative Assembly election. Lalduhoma contested from Lunglei constituency, but lost. Realising his political situation, Indira Gandhi told the Governor of Mizoram H. S. Dubey to make provision and privileges for Lalduhoma. Laduhoma was immediately appointed as Vice Chairman of Mizoram State Planning Board, at the rank of cabinet ministers.

Lalduhoma was elected on 31 May 1984 as President of Mizoram INC. His political goal focussed on peace talk and then arranged for Ladenga to return to India. Laldenga and Indira Gandhi were scheduled to meet in the afternoon of 31 October, but Gandhi was assassinated in that morning. In the 1984 Lok Sabha election in December, Laduhoma was elected as an INC candidate from Mizoram constituency. He was compelled to abdicate as President of INC the same year. As his party lacked actions for peace to his expectations, he withdrew membership from INC in 1986, which became a violation of the provision under the Anti-Defection Law of 1985 to remain in legislatures. According to the Constitution of India (Fifty-Second Amendment of 1985) Tenth Schedule (paragraph 2 clause 1a), members of the parliament and state legislature can be disqualified if they leave the party for which they were elected. The Lok Sabha Speaker disqualified him on 24 November 1988, and became the first MP to be disqualified under the anti-defection law in India for giving up membership of the party which he represented. He later commented, saying, "I am proud of my first defection, of that decision... [because it was] for the cause of peace in my state, because the peace process was getting delayed." He formed Mizo National Union (MNU) in 1986 that later merged with Mizoram People's Conference and was made working President.

Zoram Nationalist Party 
Laluhoma, supported by Students' Joint Action Committee and other political parties, created Action for Peace Committee in 1986. While visiting New Delhi, Lalduhoma got information that it was the state government who delayed the peace talk. The committee demanded the state ministry to resign from the legislature by organising public protests in early June and then mass hunger strike on 23 June. The protests prompted a peace talk that culminated in signing of the Mizoram Peace Accord on 30 June. The insurgency was officially terminated and the Mizo National Front became a recognised political party and was offered the state legislature. Lalduhoma briefly joined MNF as Advisor, but soon split from them to establish Mizo National Front (Nationalist), which was renamed Zoram Nationalist Party, in 1997. As a ZNP candidate, he was elected to Mizoram Legislative Assembly from Ratu in the 2003 election.

Zoram People's Movement 
In the 2018 election, he and his party joined a coalition party, the Zoram People's Movement (ZPM). The party officially declared him the Chief Ministerial candidate. The coalition party could not obtained recognition from the Election Commission of India as official party at the time, so he contested as an independent (not affiliated to any party) candidate. He was elected in two constituencies, Aizawl West I and Serchhip, and chose to represent Serchhip, where he defeated the incumbent Chief Minister Lal Thanhawla by 410 votes. He was elected as leader of the opposition bench of the Members of the Legislative Assembly (MLA) in the Mizoram Legislative Assembly. He continued to serve as leader of ZPM, which became a registered political party in 2019. In September 2020, 12 MLAs from the ruling party, Mizo National Front, submitted a representation to the Mizoram Legislative Assembly Speaker Lalrinliana Sailo that Lalduhoma had violated the anti-defection law on the ground that he served as leader of ZPM party while being elected as an independent candidate. According to the Anti-Defection Law (paragraph 2 clause 2), an independently elected member can be disqualified if he/she joins any party after election. Lalduhoma was disappointed and said, "I contested as independent because the registration of my party ZPM was not complete... The law is to punish defectors who join another party but I have remained failthful to the ZPM... My case is unprecedented in India." On 27 November 2020, the Speaker officially disqualified him from the legislature. He became the first MLA to be removed from the Mizoram Legislative Assembly, or any state legislature in India.

In a by-election of the Serchhip constituency on 17 April 2021, Lalduhoma reclaimed the legislative seat by defeating his major opponent Vanlalzawma of the MNF party by 3,310 votes.

Personal life 
Lalduhoma is married to Liansailovi. They have two sons and live at Chawlhhmun, Aizawl.

References

External links
 Lalduhoma Profile

Mizo people
Living people
1949 births
India MPs 1984–1989
Lok Sabha members from Mizoram
Mizoram MLAs 2018–2023
Leaders of the Opposition in Mizoram